Rajadhi Raja Raja Kulothunga Raja Marthanda Raja Gambeera Kathavaraya Krishna Kamarajan also known by the initialism, RRRKRMRGKK is a 1993 Tamil language action film directed by Balu Anand. The film stars Mansoor Ali Khan and Nandhini, with Napoleon, Srihari, Uday Prakash, Nagesh, Jai Ganesh, Vennira Aadai Moorthy and S. S. Chandran playing supporting roles. It was released on 24 June 1993. It's the longest film title ever in Tamil cinema.

Plot

Kulothungan (Mansoor Ali Khan) is a smart petty thief, he can dress up as a conductor or a police officer to rip off his victims. Despite being a thief, he helps the needy like Robin Hood.

Radhika (Nandhini), a wealthy heiress, is brought up by her three guardians : the lawyer (Nagesh), Subramanian (Jai Ganesh) and Subramanian's wife Shalu (Abhilasha) but Chalu wants to fully benefit of Radhika's heritage and she drugs Radhika with the help of a Swamy. So Radhika later becomes mentally ill as Chalu wanted. One day, Radhika manages to get away. She ends up in a brothel and she is raped by Kulothungan who was drunk. Her guardians finally find her.

Later, Shalu hires Kulothungan to play Radhika's husband and Kulothungan marries Radhika. Kulothungan decides to protect Radhika from Shalu. Soon, Shalu joins forces with Kulothungan's enemy Rao (Srihari). They kill Subramanian and blame the innocent Kulothungan. The honest police Guru Subramaniam (Napoleon) takes charge of this odd affair. What transpires later forms the crux of the story.

Cast

Mansoor Ali Khan as Kulothungan
Nandhini as Radhika
Rekha
Napoleon as Guru Subramaniam
Srihari as Rao
Uday Prakash
Nagesh as Lawyer
Jai Ganesh as Subramanian
Vennira Aadai Moorthy as Pichumani
S. S. Chandran
V. K. Ramasamy
R. Sundarrajan
Vivek as Vivek
Pandu
Idichapuli Selvaraj
T. K. S. Natarajan
Vadivukkarasi
Vichithra
Silk Smitha
Disco Shanti
Abhilasha
Bindu Kose
Radha Rani
Padmavathi
Jayanthi
Kumarimuthu
Kullamani
Oru Viral Krishna Rao
Krishnamoorthy as Yoginder
Gundu Kalyanam
Thayir Vadai Desigan
Thavakalai Chittibabu
Karuppu Subbiah
Vellai Subbaiah
Master Haja Sheriff
Nellai Siva

Soundtrack

The music was composed by Mansoor Ali Khan, who also wrote the lyrics.

Reception
Malini Mannath of The Indian Express panned the film and said: "A film strictly for his (Mansoor Ali Khan's) fans, that too the most ardent ones". New Straits Times wrote "The director has done his best to inject as much humour, action and drama as he can".

References

External links
 

1993 films
1990s Tamil-language films
Films directed by Balu Anand